Emmanuel Gómez (born December 20, 1990 in Dippa Kunda) is a Gambian footballer. He formerly played Toronto FC in Major League Soccer.

Career

Professional
Gómez began his professional career with Samger of the Gambian Championnat National D1, where he is considered to be one of the top young centre backs in his nation.

His appearances with the Gambian Under-20 national team sparked interest among many Major League Soccer clubs. In early 2009, Gómez signed with Toronto FC along with fellow countrymen Amadou Sanyang. He made his debut for Toronto on 6 June 2009, in a game against Los Angeles Galaxy.

Gomez in his second season with Toronto failed to make any appearances with the club due to knee injury that he picked up during the pre-season training. Gomez was released by Toronto FC on March 1, 2011. 

Afterwards, he returned to Samger FC. He has since made a full recovery from his injury and has played over 80 senior matches since then.

In 2014, he played for Lansdowne Bhoys FC. In 2015, he played for Clarkstown SC Eagles.

Gomez is married. He also has two daughters. His wife and two children reside in his native Gambia

International
Gómez has represented his nation at various youth levels and has two caps at senior level.

Career stats

References

External links
 
 observer.gm

1990 births
Living people
Gambian footballers
The Gambia international footballers
The Gambia youth international footballers
Gambian expatriate footballers
Expatriate soccer players in Canada
Toronto FC players
Major League Soccer players
Association football defenders
Lansdowne Yonkers FC players